The New Jalpaiguri–Alipurduar–Samuktala Road line is a railway line that connects - Siliguri Junction with Alipurduar and  in the Indian state of West Bengal. This railway line passes through the beautiful Doars region, which includes Mahananda Wildlife Sanctuary, Dooars-Terai tea gardens, Sevoke Railway Bridge, River Teesta, River Jaldhaka, River Torsha, Gorumara National Park, Buxa Tiger Reserve, Jaldapara National Park, Chapramari Wildlife Sanctuary, Chilapata Forests,   Tunnels, Hills, Valleys etc.

History
Cooch Behar State Railway built the line between Geetaldaha, which connected to Lalmonirhat, and Jainti during 1893–1901. The Eastern Bengal Railway constructed the Hasimara–Alipurduar section during the period 1900–1910. The Bengal Dooars Railway also constructed certain lines in the area. Their longest line was from Lalmonirhat to the western Dooars. Those were metre-gauge railways. The Eastern Bengal Railway and the Assam Bengal Railway were merged during World War II and came to be known as the Bengal Assam Railway. With the partition of India in 1947, the Indian part of Bengal Assam Railway became Assam Railway, which subsequently became part of North Eastern Railway and Northeast Frontier Railway. The metre-gauge track was converted to  broad gauge.

Locale

The Dooars or the Himalayan foothills cover a stretch of about 140 km in the northern part of Jalpaiguri district between the Teesta and Sankosh rivers with fields, forests and tea gardens in the backdrop of low hills. Numerous mountain streams criss-cross the region. The Dooars are particularly notable for its forests and wild life sanctuaries – Gorumara National Park, Jaldapara National Park, Chapramari Wildlife Sanctuary, Chilapata Forests, and Buxa Tiger Reserve. The New Jalpaiguri–Alipurduar–Samuktala Road line runs through the area. It also runs through another sanctuary outside the Dooars – Mahananda Wildlife Sanctuary.

Elephants
As the line runs through deep forests, it faces problems with elephant herds. A large number of elephants have been killed by speeding trains. There have been restrictions on the speed of trains, particularly at night, followed by protests by the local population.

Sikkim connection

The railway line up to Rangpo is expected to be completed in December 2023. In the second phase the line will be extended up to Gangtok, the capital of Sikkim.

Branch lines
The broad gauge branch line i.e New Mal–Changrabandha–New Cooch Behar line from Malbazar in Jalpaiguri district to Changrabandha in Cooch Behar district exists with connecting line to New Cooch Behar. Old metre gauge extension of this line on the Bangladesh side from Burimari to Lalmonirhat is still functional.
 
The Alipuduar–Bamanhat branch line ends near the India–Bangladesh border across the Dharla River. In pre-independence days, it used to connect to Mogalhat, now in Bangladesh, across the Dharla. The bridge is broken. The line from Golokganj meets the branch line. Dhubri-New Jalpaiguri Inter-city Express via Cooch Behar was introduced in February 2012.

Rajabhatkawa-Jainti line is a new project sanctioned in 2012–13.

Important Railway Stations
Important railway stations in this line are as follows:
 New Jalpaiguri Junction
 
 Siliguri Junction
 
 Sivok Junction
 
 
 
 New Malbazar Junction 
 

 
 
 
 Binnaguri Junction
 
 
 
 
 
 
 
 Alipurduar Junction
 Salsalabari
 Samuktala Road Junction

References

External links

Trains at Hasimara

|

5 ft 6 in gauge railways in India
Rail transport in West Bengal
Transport in Jalpaiguri
Transport in Alipurduar
Alipurduar railway division
Transport in Siliguri